Ghedi is a town and comune in the province of Brescia, in Lombardy, Italy. It received the honorary title of city with a presidential decree on November 24, 2001.

Ghedi is known for a base of the Italian Air Force, Ghedi Air Base. It was also the site of the Palazzo Orsini, now demolished, a c.1515 doorway from which survives in the collection of the Victoria and Albert Museum in London.

Geography

Climate
This town's climate is described as having relatively high temperatures and evenly distributed precipitation throughout the year. This climate type is found on the eastern sides of the continents between 20° and 35° N and S latitude.  The Köppen Climate Classification subtype for this climate is "Cfa". (Humid Subtropical Climate).

Sources

External links
 Oratorio di Ghedi

See also 
 Battle of Ghedi (15th century)

Cities and towns in Lombardy